Language Education Institute is the Korean as a foreign language department within Pusan National University.
In its field of university-level Korean-language education, LEI competes with: Yonsei University Korean Language Institute, Myongji University Korean Language Institute, Seoul National University Korean Language Education Center, Sogang University Korean Language Education Center, and Busan University of Foreign Studies, among others.

Homonymic institution
The Korean LEI is not to be confused with the Mongolia International University Language Education Institute, which is a language school that focuses on English.

References

External links
 

Korean-language education